Cosmas I may refer to:

 Pope Cosmas I of Alexandria, ruled in 729–730
 Patriarch Cosmas I of Alexandria, Greek Patriarch of Alexandria in 727–768
 Cosmas I of Constantinople, Ecumenical  Patriarch in 1075–1081